Missunderstood (stylized in all lowercase) is the debut studio album by American singer Queen Naija. The album was released on October 30, 2020, through Capitol. The production on the album was handled by multiple producers including Boi-1da, T-Minus, Jahaan Sweet, Hitmaka, Lil' Ronnie and Pooh Beatz among others. The album also features guest appearances by Lil Durk, Russ, Toosii, Jacquees, Mulatto and Kiana Ledé. The deluxe version features guest appearances by Ari Lennox, Wale and J.I the Prince of N.Y.

Missunderstood was supported by four singles: "Butterflies Pt. 2", "Pack Lite", "Lie to Me" and "Set Him Up". The album received generally positive reviews from music critics and was a moderate commercial success. It debuted at number nine on the US Billboard 200 and number one on the US Top R&B Albums charts, earning 34,000 album-equivalent units in its first week. A deluxe edition titled Missunderstood...Still was released on April 16, 2021, including six new tracks and a remix of Butterflies Pt. 2 featuring Wale.

Critical reception

Andy Kellman of AllMusic praised Queen Naija's artistic development. Kellman said "While Queen Naija has excelled with singles, the longer format allows her diaristic songwriting to truly flourish, and there's more poise and nuance in her lithe vocals without sacrificing the power of her rawest expressions." He also praised her work saying that "Queen Naija could have rushed her debut album. Instead, she took her time with Missunderstood, and it shows." Ultimately, Kellman gave the album a rating of 4 stars out of 5.

Commercial performance
Missunderstood debuted at number one on the US Top R&B Albums chart, earning 34,000 album-equivalent units in its first week, according to MRC Data. This became Queen Naija's first number one album on the chart. The album also debuted at number nine on the US Billboard 200 and number six on the US Top R&B/Hip-Hop Albums charts respectively. This became Queen Naija's first US top-ten debut on both charts. In addition, the album also accumulated a total of 33.87 million on-demand streams of the set's songs.

Five songs from Missunderstood charted on the US Hot R&B Songs chart, with "Lie to Me" at number 10, "Butterflies Pt. 2" at number 12, "Pack Lite" at number 14, "Bitter" at number 18 and "Too Much to Say" at number 25.

Track listing

Sample credits

 “Pack Lite” samples “Xxplosive” by Dr. Dre & interpolates “Bag Lady” by Erykah Badu.
 “Lie to Me” samples “A Dream” by DeBarge & interpolates “This Luv” by Donell Jones.
 “Pressure” interpolates “Can U Get Away” by Tupac Shakur.

Charts

References

2020 debut albums
Capitol Records albums
Universal Music Group albums